Impact Partners is an American film production and television production company founded in 2007, by Dan Cogan and Geralyn Dreyfous. The company primarily produces documentary films focusing on social issues.

They have produced such films as The Queen of Versailles (2012), How to Survive a Plague (2012), The Hunting Ground (2015), Icarus, which won the Academy Award for Best Documentary Feature, Of Fathers and Sons (2017), Won't You Be My Neighbor (2018), and On the Record (2020).

History
In 2007, Dan Cogan and Geralyn Dreyfous founded the company, focusing on financing and producing documentary film and television projects, focusing on social issues.

The company has produced films which have gone on to receive critical acclaim and awards, including Freeheld (2007), which won Academy Award for Best Documentary (Short Subject), The Hunting Ground (2015), which was nominated for Primetime Emmy Award for Exceptional Merit in Documentary Filmmaking, Icarus (2017), which won the Academy Award for Best Documentary Feature, Of Fathers and Sons (2017), which was nominated for Best Documentary Feature, Divide and Conquer: The Story of Roger Ailes (2018), nominated for the Primetime Emmy Award for Exceptional Merit in Documentary Filmmaking, and The Apollo which won the Primetime Emmy for Exceptional Merit in Documentary Filmmaking.

Apart from films, the company has produced television shows including Immigration Nation for Netflix, and Allen v. Farrow for HBO.

In 2018, the company announced it would support the development of 4-8 non-fiction projects a year, ranging between $10k-100k. In January 2020, Jenny Raskin was named executive director of the company.

Filmography
 2007: Freeheld
 2010: The End of America
 2012: The Queen of Versailles 
 2012: How to Survive a Plague
 2013: Web Junkie
 2013: Anita: Speaking Truth to Power
 2014: Meet the Patels
 2014: Do I Sound Gay?
 2015: The Hunting Ground
 2016: Audrie & Daisy
 2016: Notes on Blindness
 2016: City of Joy
 2017: Icarus
 2017: Step
 2017: Bending the Arc
 2017: Nobody Speak: Trials of the Free Press
 2017: Of Fathers and Sons
 2017: Voyeur
 2018: Won't You Be My Neighbor?
 2018: Bathtubs Over Broadway
 2018: The Feeling of Being Watched
 2018: Divide and Conquer: The Story of Roger Ailes
 2019: Shooting the Mafia
 2019: The Apollo
 2019: The Kingmaker
 2020: Us Kids
 2020: On the Record
 2020: Spaceship Earth
 2020: Giving Voice
 2020: Athlete A
 2020: Television Event
 2021: Ailey
 2021: Allen v. Farrow
 2021: Dear Mr. Brody
 2021: Fathom
 2021: Procession 
 2021: Nuclear Family
 2021: Found
 2022: 32 Sounds
 2022: To the End
 2022: Aftershock
 2022: Mija
 2022: The Return of Tanya Tucker: Featuring Brandi Carlile
 2022: The Grab
 2023: It's Only Life After All

References

External links
 

American companies established in 2007
Film production companies of the United States